Expressway S16 is a planned road in Poland. It is known that it may have briefly appeared first in Polish government long range planning documents around 2005 (there is some confusion on this point) but was subsequently dropped from construction plans. In October 2015 the route was added to the list of expressways by ministry ordinance.

References 

Roads in Poland